The 1974 All-East football team consists of American football players chosen by various selectors as the best players at each position among the Eastern colleges and universities during the 1974 NCAA Division I football season.

Offense

Quarterback
 Steve Joachim, Temple (AP-1)

Running backs
 Keith Barnette, Boston College (AP-1)
 Tony Dorsett, Pittsburgh (AP-1)
 Walt Snickenberger, Princeton (AP-1)

Tight end
 Dick Pawlewicz, William & Mary (AP-1)

Wide receivers
 Pat McInally, Harvard (AP-1)

Tackles
 Al Krevis, Boston College (AP-1)
 Charlie Palmer, Yale (AP-1)

Guards
 Pat Staub, Temple (AP-1)
 Reynold Stoner, Pittsburgh (AP-1)

Center
 Jack Baiorunos, Penn State (AP-1)

Defense

Ends
 Greg Murphy, Penn State (AP-1)
 Nate Toran, Rutgers (AP-1)

Tackles
 Mike Hartenstine, Penn State (AP-1)
 Bob Shaw, Harvard (AP-1)

Middle guard
 Gary Burley, Pittsburgh (AP-1)

Linebackers
 Alex MacLellan, Boston College (AP-1)
 Chet Moeller, Navy (AP-1)
 Reggie Williams, Dartmouth (AP-1)

Defensive backs 
 Elvin Charity, Yale (AP-1)
 Ed Jones, Rutgers (AP-1)
 John Provost, Holy Cross (AP-1)

Key
 AP = Associated Press
 UPI = United Press International

See also
 1974 College Football All-America Team

References

All-Eastern
All-Eastern college football teams